Yeung Ching Kwong (born 7 May 1976 in Hong Kong) is a former Hong Kong professional football player and currently a football coach.

Managerial career
Yeung worked previously as an assistant with Pegasus and South China.

In 2015, he served as head coach of Eastern before resigning on 8 December 2015 to become an assistant coach with Meizhou Hakka. His successor, Chan Yuen Ting, led Eastern to the 2015–16 Hong Kong Premier League title and became the first woman to lead a men's professional side to a league title.

On 31 March 2017, Pegasus announced via Facebook that Yeung had returned to the club to become an assistant coach under manager Kevin Bond. Following Bond's departure to join Harry Redknapp's coaching staff at Birmingham City, Yeung was promoted to be the head coach in June 2017.

On 14 June 2018, Yeung was announced as the head coach of Hong Kong Premier League side R&F. On 19 May 2019, Yeung disclosed to the media that he had renewed his contract for a further two years. On 14 October 2020, he left the club after his club announced its withdrawal from HKPL in the new season.

Career statistics

Club
As of 1 February 2009.

References

External links
 Yeung Ching Kwong at HKFA
 Scaafc.com 球員資料 - 8. 楊正光 
 SCAA Official Blog 8號 楊正光 (Yeung Ching Kwong) 

1976 births
Living people
Hong Kong footballers
Association football midfielders
Hong Kong First Division League players
Eastern Sports Club footballers
South China AA players
TSW Pegasus FC players
Kitchee SC players
Hong Kong international footballers
South China AA managers
Hong Kong football managers
Hong Kong League XI representative players